Fortuna is a Brazilian female singer-songwriter of Sephardic Jewish background, and a researcher of the Sephardic tradition since 1992.

Fortuna, whose stage name is Fortunee Safdié Joyce (born c. 1958), is a Brazilian Sephardi Jewish singer and composer born in São Paulo, Brazil. She has been studying the Sephardic repertoire since 1992. Fortuna has recorded seven CDs and one DVD since then. She has worked on a number of occasions with the Choir of the Monastery of the Monks of St Benedict in São Paulo, and with the Guri Choir, composed of children and adolescents in the city.

Fortuna sings mainly in Hebrew and Ladino, a language used by Sephardi Jews who inhabited the Iberian Peninsula until the fifteenth century, at which time they were expelled by the Catholic Monarchs and scattered through several countries of the Mediterranean basin.

Discography
 15 Years Collection (Coletânea 15 anos)
 At Ruth's House (Na casa da Ruth – CD and DVD)
 New World (Novo Mundo) – 2005
 Meeting (Encontros) – 2003
 Caelestia (CD and DVD) – 2001
 Mazal – 2000
 Mediterranean (Meditarrâneo) – 1998
 Songs (Cantigas) – 1998
 The First Time (La Prima Vez) – 1998

References

External links
 

1958 births
Brazilian Sephardi Jews
Hebrew-language singers
Judaeo-Spanish-language singers
Singers from São Paulo
20th-century Sephardi Jews
Living people
20th-century Brazilian women singers
20th-century Brazilian singers
21st-century Brazilian women singers
21st-century Brazilian singers